Turco-Albanian (Tourk-alvanoi) is an ethnographic, religious, and derogatory term used by Greeks for Muslim Albanians  from 1715 and thereafter. In a broader sense, the term included both Muslim Albanian and Turkish political and military elites of the Ottoman administration in the Balkans. The term is derived from an identification of Muslims with Ottomans and/or Turks, due to the Ottoman Empire's administrative millet system of classifying peoples according to religion, where the 
Muslim millet played the leading role. From the middle of the nineteenth century, the term Turk and from the late nineteenth century onwards, the derivative term Turco-Albanian has been used as a pejorative term, phrase and or expression for Muslim Albanian individuals and communities. The term has also been noted to be unclear, ideologically and sentimentally charged, and an imperialist and racialist expression. Albanians have expressed derision and disassociation toward the terms Turk and its derivative form Turco-Albanian regarding the usage of those terms in reference to them. It has been reported that at the end of the 20th century some Christian Albanians still used the term "Turk" to refer to Muslim Albanians.

Etymology and usage of the term
The term Turco-Albanian is a compound made up of the words Turk and Albanian. The word Albanian was and still is a term used as an ethnonym. Whereas the word Turk was viewed at times by Western Europeans or by non Muslim Balkan peoples as being synonymous with Muslim. A study of a collection of Albanian folk songs, published in 1870s by Thimi Mitko, suggests that most Albanian speakers of his time identified themselves and each other through various terms and not a single national designation. Among other terms, Muslims were identified as turq or turkollarë ("Turks").

Apart from being associated with Muslim Albanians, in some specific works the term Turco-Albanian was used to mention the Labs, a socio-cultural and dialectal Albanian subdivision, some of whom had converted to Islam during the Ottoman Empire era.

In a broader sense the term Turco-Albanian was used to denote Ottoman military units and elites of both Turkish and Albanian ethnicity that represented the  Ottoman administration of the Balkans. Within the Ottoman Empire, Muslim Albanians were closely part of the administrative structures of the state and considered one of its important peoples.

Reference to Muslim Albanian communities as Turco-Albanian is made for those that settled the Peloponnese in order to spread Islam from c. 1715 until after 1770, as part of official Ottoman policy. Later in 1770, Muslim Albanian mercenaries referred to as Turco-Albanian were employed by the Ottoman Sultan to suppress the Greek uprising. Their activity included massacres, looting and  destruction in the regions of Epirus, Western Macedonia, Central Greece, Thessaly, Peloponnese suffered most destruction and massacre due to the activity of 15,000 Muslim Albanian mercenaries. In 1779 the Ottoman army finally managed to drive those groups out of Peloponnese, while the remaining ones were either killed by local villagers or found refuge in Muslim Albanian communities in Lala and Vardounia. The period of 1770–1779 is generally termed as Alvanokratia (Albanian rule) in Greek historiography. As a result, local Greek traditions in Epirus since the late 18th century mention frequent raids and looting by "Turko-Albanians" or "Albanian" bands. This kind of activity was connected with the depopulation of settlements.

Later, during the Greek War of Independence (1821–1830) reference to Turco-Albanians is made for those Muslim Albanians that fought in the Ottoman side against the Greek revolutionaries.

Muslims Albanians are thus often pejoratively named and or called by Greeks as "Turks", represented in the expression "Turkalvanoi". As with the term "Turk", the expression (rendered also as Turco-Albanian) was employed by some writers mainly in nineteenth and early twentieth century Western European literature regarding Muslim Albanian populations. As such, the word Turk within its usage also attained derogatory and derisive meanings that when applied to other words created pejorative meanings of cruel and inhumane behavior and or of being backward and savage. Within a Balkans context during the twentieth century, the usage of the word "Turk" (and "Turkey") has also been politically employed to differentiate the "indigenous" from the "alien" that interpreted Balkan Muslims as "foreigners". With the case of the Albanians, this at times has resulted in Albanophobia, negative stereotyping, socio-political discrimination and even mass violence.

Usage in Greek media and literature
At the beginning of the 1880s the Greek press openly used the term "Turco-Albanian brigands" to incite hate speech and to associate Albanian nationalists with "Turkish anti-Greek propaganda". During the years 1882–1897 some Greek media and publications initiated a campaign to promote friendship and a potential future alliance between Greeks and Albanians. As such they avoided the use of the term Turco-Albanian and pointed to the common features shared by both populations. New mixed terms Greek-Albanians and Greek-Pelasgians were used instead. The term Turco-Albanian after the Greek War of Independence was also sometimes used in 19th century Greek school text books for Muslim Albanians. Greek nationalist histories still uses the more widely known pejorative term Turco-Albanian instead of Muslim Albanians.

Relative terms
Various Muslim Albanian communities by Greeks were similarly also labelled such as the Turco-Bardouniots (or Τουρκοβαρδουνιώτες, Tourko-Vardouniotes). and Turco-Chams (or Τουρκοτσάμηδες, Tourko-tsamides) In Thesprotia older designations based on religion were used for Albanian Muslim Chams by the local Orthodox population who referred to them as "Turks" (i.e.: Muslims), a term still used in the region by some elderly people. The term Turco-Albanian was also used by both British intelligence and the German army for Muslim Albanian Chams during World War II and it was borrowed from Greek usage. Moreover, in Greek, similar composite ethnographic terms that also reveal the ethnic or religious background of the specific communities have also been used, such as Turco-Cretans (or Τουρκοκρήτες, Tourkokrites), and Turco-Cypriots (or Τουρκοκύπριοι, Tourkokiprioi).
 
Amongst the wider Greek-speaking population, until the interwar period of the twentieth century, the term Arvanitis (plural: Arvanites) was used to describe an Albanian speaker, regardless of their religious affiliations, including Islam. On the other hand, within Greek Epirus, the term Arvanitis is still used for an Albanian speaker, regardless of their citizenship and religion.

See also
Albanophobia
Turcophobia
Islamophobia
Xenophobia 
List of ethnic slurs
Ottoman Albania
Ottoman Kosovo
Ottoman Vardar Macedonia
Islam in Albania
Islam in Kosovo
Islam in the Republic of Macedonia
Islam in Montenegro
Islam in Serbia
Islam in Greece

References

Sources
 

Anti-Albanian sentiment
Islam in Albania
Islam in Kosovo
Islam in North Macedonia
Islam in Montenegro
Islam in Serbia
Islam in Greece
Ottoman Albania
Ottoman Greece
Ottoman period in the history of Kosovo
Ottoman period in the history of North Macedonia
Ethnic and religious slurs
Islam-related slurs
Anti-Turkish sentiment